Cathedral of the Resurrection of Christ, Church of the Resurrection of Christ, or Resurrection of Christ Cathedral may refer to:

 Resurrection of Christ Cathedral, Narva, an Estonian Orthodox Church of Moscow Patriarchate in Narva, Estonia
 Cathedral of the Resurrection of Christ, Podgorica, Montenegro
 Church of Resurrection of Christ, Kumanovo, an Orthodox church building under construction in Kumanovo, North Macedonia
 Church of the Resurrection, Kokshetau, Kazakhstan
 Cathedral of the Resurrection of Christ, Kubinka, Russia
 Church of Resurrection of Christ in Kadashi, a major Naryshkin Baroque church in Moscow, Russia
 Cathedral of the Resurrection of Christ, Kyiv, Ukraine
 Cathedral of the Resurrection of Christ, Ivano-Frankivsk, Ukraine

See also 
 Cathedral of the Resurrection (disambiguation)
 Church of the Resurrection (disambiguation)
 Holy Resurrection Church (disambiguation)